Scott Eric Meents (born January 4, 1964) is an American former professional basketball player who played in the National Basketball Association (NBA) and the Continental Basketball Association (CBA).

Meents, a 6'10" 225 power forward born in Kankakee, Illinois, played four years at the University of Illinois and was selected by the Chicago Bulls with the fourth pick in the 4th round of the 1986 NBA Draft and averaged 1.8 points and 1.0 rebound per game with the Seattle SuperSonics from 1989 to 1991. Later during the 1991 offseason he signed with the Utah Jazz but was waived just days later.

He also played with the Continental Basketball Association's Rockford Lightning.

References

External links
College & NBA stats @ basketballreference.com

1964 births
Living people
American expatriate basketball people in Germany
American expatriate basketball people in Italy
American expatriate basketball people in Venezuela
American men's basketball players
Bakersfield Jammers players
Basketball players from Illinois
Chicago Bulls draft picks
Chicago Rockers players
Cocodrilos de Caracas players
Galatasaray S.K. (men's basketball) players
Giessen 46ers players
Illinois Fighting Illini men's basketball players
Nuova Pallacanestro Gorizia players
Power forwards (basketball)
Rochester Renegade players
Rockford Lightning players
Scaligera Basket Verona players
Seattle SuperSonics players
Small forwards
Sportspeople from Kankakee, Illinois
Yakima Sun Kings players